Unspoken is a 2008 Belgian drama film. It was written and directed by Fien Troch, produced by Antonino Lombardo, and starred Emmanuelle Devos and Bruno Todeschini.

The film tells the story of Grace, who is still grappling with the disappearance of her daughter five years earlier, and her husband Lukas, who is trapped in his own helpless grief. He and Grace have long since stopped communicating. As Grace confronts a series of small absurdities in her apartment building, Lukas finds himself unable to complete even the simplest of daily tasks. When something truly heartbreaking happens in a family, the deepest response is often unspoken.

Unspoken had its world premiere at the 2008 Toronto International Film Festival. It has received high praise from film critics and won various awards from numerous film organizations and festivals. The film was named Best Film of 2009 by the Belgian Film Critics Association (UCC) winning the André Cavens Award. Emmanuelle Devos received Best Female Performance at the 26th Torino Film Festival. The film was also nominated for the Grand Prix at the Flanders International Film Festival Ghent.

Notes

External links
 
 
 

2008 films
Belgian drama films
2000s French-language films
French-language Belgian films
Films directed by Fien Troch